The Auto Towners is a Barbershop quartet that won the 1966 SPEBSQSA international competition.

At the time they won the 1966 SPEBSQSA International Championship (held in Chicago), the Auto Towners were composed of Al Rehkop (tenor), Glenn Van Tassell (lead), Clint Bostick (baritone), and Carl Dahlke (bass). An original song composed by Rehkop, "In My Brand New Automobile", has been covered by other barbershop quartets. Rehkop and Van Tassel won a second time with the Gentleman's Agreement quartet in 1971.

Discography
The Auto Towners – AIC Masterworks CD

References
 AIC entry (archived)

Barbershop quartets